Dillod is a village in the Bhopal district of Madhya Pradesh, India. It is located in the Berasia tehsil.

Demographics 

According to the 2011 census of India, Dillod has 534 households. The literacy rate of the village is 67.01%.

References 

Villages in Berasia tehsil